Prolabeops nyongensis is a cyprinid fish in the genus Prolabeops. It inhabits Cameroon and has been assessed as "data deficient" on the IUCN Red List.

References

Endemic fauna of Cameroon
Cyprinid fish of Africa
Fish of Cameroon